Sergei Viktorovich Zhelanov (born 14 June 1957 in Aleksin, Tula Oblast) is a Soviet athlete who mainly competed in the Decathlon. He trained at Dynamo in Moscow.

He competed for the Soviet Union at the 1980 Summer Olympics held in Moscow, Soviet Union where he won the bronze medal in the men's decathlon event.

References

1957 births
Living people
People from Aleksinsky District
Soviet decathletes
Russian decathletes
Olympic bronze medalists for the Soviet Union
Athletes (track and field) at the 1980 Summer Olympics
Olympic athletes of the Soviet Union
Dynamo sports society athletes
Medalists at the 1980 Summer Olympics
Olympic bronze medalists in athletics (track and field)
Universiade medalists in athletics (track and field)
Universiade silver medalists for the Soviet Union
Medalists at the 1981 Summer Universiade
Sportspeople from Tula Oblast